Heinrich Fraenkel (28 September 1897 – May 1986) was a writer and Hollywood screenwriter best known for his biographies of Nazi war criminals published in the 1960s and 1970s.

Biography
Fraenkel was born in Lissa, Poland (then Province of Posen, Germany), into a Jewish family. He emigrated from Nazi Germany and lived in Britain.

His works include:
 Göring (1962, with Roger Manvell).
 Hess: A Biography (1971, with Roger Manvell).
 The Canaris Conspiracy: The Secret Resistance to Hitler in the German Army, by Roger Manvell, Heinrich Fraenkel, 1st Edition (1972).

Under the pseudonym "Assiac", Fraenkel edited a chess column in the New Statesman and published several chess books, among them Adventures in Chess (1951, the American edition was published as The Pleasures of Chess, and on pp. 183–184 of that book, Fraenkel explained that "Assiac" is "Caïssa", the goddess of chess, spelled backwards).

He died in Ealing, England.

Selected filmography
 The Dance Goes On (1930)
 The Sacred Flame (1931)
 Menace (1934)
 Youthful Folly (1934)

References

External links

Heinrich Fraenkel Papers (MSS 319), Center for Southwest Research and Special Collections, University of New Mexico Libraries. 

1897 births
1986 deaths
Jewish emigrants from Nazi Germany to the United Kingdom
German biographers
Male biographers
British chess writers
Officers Crosses of the Order of Merit of the Federal Republic of Germany
German male non-fiction writers
People from Leszno
British Jewish writers
Historians of World War II
British biographers
British male screenwriters
20th-century biographers
20th-century British screenwriters
German screenwriters
German male screenwriters